Nicco Montaño (born December 16, 1988) is an American mixed martial artist who last competed in the bantamweight division of the Ultimate Fighting Championship. She was the inaugural UFC Women's Flyweight Champion.

Background
Of Navajo, Chickasaw, and Hispanic descent, Montaño was born  in Lukachukai, Arizona. She graduated from Chinle High School in 2006 then she attended Arizona State University, in Tempe, AZ before transferring to Diné College in Tsaile, AZ, and finally ending up at Fort Lewis College in Durango, Colorado. It was there, in Durango she signed up at Durango Martial Arts Academy and ignited her passion for martial arts.

Montaño began training in boxing at an early age. She eventually took up Brazilian jiu-jitsu before becoming an MMA fighter in 2013.

Mixed martial arts career
After an amateur career that saw her produce a record of 5–0, Montaño made her professional mixed martial arts debut in November 2015. Competing primarily for King of the Cage, where she won the KOTC Women's Flyweight Championship, Montaño compiled a record of 3–2 before joining the cast of The Ultimate Fighter 26 in mid 2017.

The Ultimate Fighter
In August 2017, it was announced that Montaño was one of the fighters selected to be on The Ultimate Fighter: A New World Champion.

In her first fight on the show, Montaño faced UFC veteran Lauren Murphy. She won the fight via unanimous decision after two rounds.

In the quarterfinals, Montaño faced off against Montana Stewart. She won the fight via unanimous decision after two rounds.

In the semifinals, Montaño faced former Invicta FC Flyweight Champion Barb Honchak. She won the fight via unanimous decision after three rounds.

Ultimate Fighting Championship
Montaño was expected to fight Sijara Eubanks for the inaugural UFC Women's Flyweight Championship at The Ultimate Fighter 26 Finale on December 1, 2017. However, Eubanks was  pulled from the fight for kidney failure while trying to make weight, and was replaced by Roxanne Modafferi. Montaño won the fight via unanimous decision and claimed the inaugural UFC Women's Flyweight Championship title. This win also earned her the Fight of the Night bonus. At the post fight interview, Montaño revealed her financial struggles prior to her win and her appreciation for the prize money she was about to receive:
 “We were dirt poor just before tonight in all reality. I’m going to go move to an apartment with some water pressure, and buy some good food and treats for my cats.”
 

Montaño was scheduled to face Valentina Shevchenko on September 8, 2018, at UFC 228. However, prior to the weigh-ins for the event, Montaño was transported to a hospital due to the effects of weight cutting and the bout was cancelled. Montaño was subsequently stripped of the UFC Women's Flyweight title.

It was reported that on  April 23, 2019, Montaño was suspended by USADA for 6 months for testing positive for ostarine from an out-of-competition test conducted on October 25, 2018. Suspension retroactive from November 15, 2018. She was eligible to fight again on May 15, 2019.

Montaño was expected to face Sara McMann in a bantamweight bout on July 13, 2019, at UFC Fight Night 155. However, McMann pulled out of the bout citing an injury and was replaced by Julianna Peña. She lost the fight via unanimous decision.

Montaño was scheduled to face Macy Chiasson on February 15, 2020, at UFC Fight Night 167. However, Montaño was forced to pull from the event due to injury and she was replaced by Shanna Young.

Montaño was scheduled to face Julia Avila on August 8, 2020, at UFC Fight Night 174.  However, due to Montano's coach John Wood testing positive for COVID-19, the bout was rescheduled to UFC Fight Night 176. However, Montaño tested positive for COVID-19 and the bout was moved to UFC Fight Night: Holm vs. Aldana. Subsequently, on September 3, it was announced that Montaño withdrew from the bout due to travel restrictions. In turn Avila was rescheduled to face Sijara Eubanks at UFC Fight Night 177 on September 12.

Montaño was scheduled to face Karol Rosa on February 6, 2021, at UFC Fight Night 184. However, for undisclosed reason, she was pulled from the bout and was replaced by Joselyne Edwards.

Montaño was scheduled to face Wu Yanan on July 31, 2021, at UFC on ESPN 28. However, due to Montaño missing weight by seven pounds at the weigh-ins, her fight against Yanan was canceled.

On August 3, 2021, Montaño was released by the UFC.

Championships and accomplishments

Mixed martial arts
Ultimate Fighting Championship
UFC Women's Flyweight Champion (One time, inaugural)
Fight of the Night (One time) vs. Roxanne Modafferi

Mixed martial arts record

  
|-
|Loss
|align=center| 4–3
|Julianna Peña
|Decision (unanimous)
|UFC Fight Night: de Randamie vs. Ladd 
|
|align=center|3
|align=center|5:00
|Sacramento, California, United States
|
|- 
|Win
|align=center| 4–2
|Roxanne Modafferi
|Decision (unanimous)
|The Ultimate Fighter: A New World Champion Finale 
|
|align=center|5
|align=center|5:00
|Las Vegas, Nevada, United States
|
|-
|Loss
|align=center | 3–2
|Julia Avila
|Decision (unanimous)
|HD MMA 7: Avila vs. Montaño
|
|align=center | 5
|align=center | 5:00
|Oklahoma City, Oklahoma, United States
|
|-
| Win
| align=center | 3–1
| Jamie Milanowski
| TKO (punches)
| KOTC: Social Disorder
| 
| align=center | 4
| align=center | 4:34
| Sloan, Iowa, United States
| 
|-
|Win
|align=center|2–1
|Shana Dobson
|Decision (unanimous)
|KOTC: Will Power
|
|align=center|3
|align=center|5:00
|Albuquerque, New Mexico, United States
|
|-
|Loss
|align=center | 1–1
|Pam Sorenson
|Decision (split)
|KOTC: Frozen War
|
|align=center | 3
|align=center | 5:00
|Walker, Minnesota, United States
|
|-
|Win
|align=center | 1–0
|Stacey Sigala
|TKO (punches)
|KOTC: Evolution
|
|align=center| 1
|align=center| 4:15
|Albuquerque, New Mexico, United States
|
|-

Mixed martial arts exhibition record

|-
| Win
| align=center | 3–0
| Barb Honchak
| Decision (unanimous)
|rowspan=3| The Ultimate Fighter: A New World Champion
|  (air date)
| align=Center | 3
| align=center  | 5:00
|rowspan=3| Las Vegas, Nevada, United States
| 
|-
| Win
| align=center | 2–0
| Montana De La Rosa
| Decision (unanimous)
|  (air date)
| align=Center | 2
| align=center  | 5:00
| 
|-
| Win
| align=center | 1–0
| Lauren Murphy
| Decision (unanimous)
|  (air date)
| align=center | 2
| align=center | 5:00
|

See also
 List of female mixed martial artists

References

External links
 
 

 

1988 births
Living people
 Native American sportspeople
People from Apache County, Arizona
Arizona State University alumni
Fort Lewis College alumni
Ultimate Fighting Championship champions
American female mixed martial artists
American people of Navajo descent
American people of Chickasaw descent
Flyweight mixed martial artists
Bantamweight mixed martial artists
Mixed martial artists utilizing boxing
Mixed martial artists utilizing Brazilian jiu-jitsu
Mixed martial artists from Arizona
Doping cases in mixed martial arts
Ultimate Fighting Championship female fighters
American practitioners of Brazilian jiu-jitsu
Female Brazilian jiu-jitsu practitioners
21st-century American women
21st-century Native American women
21st-century Native Americans